The Parent 'Hood is an American sitcom television series that aired on The WB from January 18, 1995, to July 25, 1999. The series starred Robert Townsend and Suzzanne Douglas. Originally to be titled Father Knows Nothing (a parody of the title of the 1950s sitcom Father Knows Best), the series was one of the four sitcoms that aired as part of the original Wednesday-night two-hour lineup that helped launch The WB network (along with The Wayans Bros., Unhappily Ever After, and the short-lived Muscle).

On November 1, 2021, The Parent 'Hood had several episodes available to stream on HBO Max.

Premise 
The series revolves around  a former Black English professor, Robert Peterson, who must cope with fatherhood after his wife, Jerri decides to return to the working field  to their four children which they share in their upper middle class apartment brownstone in Manhattan. Robert quickly learns that he needs to rule his house with an iron fist as he realizes the world his kids are growing up in was different from how he grew up.

Cast
 Robert Townsend as Robert Peterson
 Suzzanne Douglas as Geraldine "Jerri" Peterson
 Kenny Blank as Michael Peterson (seasons 1–3)
 Reagan Gomez-Preston as Zaria Peterson
 Curtis Williams as Nicholas Peterson
 Ashli Amari Adams as Cecilia "CeCe" Peterson
 Bobby McGee as Derek Sawyer (season 1)
 Carol Woods as Mrs. Wilcox (season 1)
 Faizon Love as Wendell Wilcox (seasons 2–4, main; season 1, recurring)
 Tyrone Dorzell Burton as T.K. Anderson (seasons 4–5)
 Kelly Perine as Kelly Peterson (season 5)

Episodes

References

External links
 
 

1990s American black sitcoms
1990s American sitcoms
1995 American television series debuts
1999 American television series endings
English-language television shows
Television series about families
Television series by Warner Bros. Television Studios
Television shows set in New York City
The WB original programming